The Caucus on Reform and Governance Committee (Malay: Kaukus Mengenai Pembaharuan dan Tadbir Urus; ; Tamil: மலேசியாவின் சீர்திருத்தம் மற்றும் நிர்வாகக் குழு குறித்த காகஸ்) is one of many committees of the Malaysian House of Representatives, which seeks to empower the parliament as branch of the government responsible in instituting reforms in all aspects of the administration. It is the only caucus announced by Speaker of the House of Representatives, Mohamad Ariff Md Yusof, on 4 December 2018 in an effort to improve the institutional system.

Recommendations 
Anwar Ibrahim told reporters in late January 2019 that the inaugural meeting of the caucus had recommended that the annual Human Rights Commission of Malaysia (SUHAKAM) report be debated in the lower and upper Houses. It was also recommended that the Chief Justice of Malaysia head an independent panel overlooking legislative reforms.

Following allegations of interference in the judicial system, the caucus' deputy chair, Lim Kit Siang, announced that the caucus decided to support calls for the establishment of a Royal Commission of Inquiry (RCI) to look into the claims.

Membership

14th Parliament 
As of December 2018, the Committee's current members are as follows:

Chair of the Caucus on Reform and Governance Committee

Deputy Chair of the Caucus on Reform and Governance Committee

See also 
 Parliamentary Committees of Malaysia

References 

Parliament of Malaysia
Committees of the Parliament of Malaysia
Committees of the Dewan Rakyat